Eddy Creek is a stream in Caldwell and Lyon counties, Kentucky, United States.

Several watermills were built on Eddy Creek in the 19th century.

See also
List of rivers of Kentucky

References

Rivers of Caldwell County, Kentucky
Rivers of Lyon County, Kentucky
Rivers of Kentucky